Laser SETI is an instrument that could continuously survey the entire night sky for brief laser pulses. The instrument can look everywhere simultaneously.  The technology, which consists of a robust assembly of straightforward optical and mechanical components, has been prototyped and subjected to preliminary tests.

It will observe all of the sky, all of the time so even relatively rare events can be found. Laser SETI can discover pulses over a wide range of pulse durations, and is especially sensitive to millisecond singleton pulses which may have been overlooked in previous astronomical surveys.

As of October 2017, the team had spent close to $50k thus far, have 21 components in hand, 5 on order or in transit, 3 ready to order, and 7 waiting on test results or TBD.

In 2018, the SETI Institute announced that they were going to be able to deploy 8 cameras instead of four, meaning that they can fully monitor two independent fields-of-view.

In 2019, the entity announced that the final logistics were being worked out for the placement of LaserSETI's first observatory at RFO's (Robert Ferguson Observatory) idyllic facility, in Sonoma County.

In summer 2021 a second LaserSETI observatory was being installed in Hawaii, and was operational by Dec 2021. Two of four cameras are fully functional. Cameras are installed in pairs with their diffraction gratings at 90 degrees to each other. Images are read out more than a thousand times a second.

References 

Search for extraterrestrial intelligence